Óscar Antonio Bernal López (born September 28, 1995), known as Óscar Bernal, is a Mexican professional football player who last played for La Equidad on loan from Santos Laguna.

Honours

International
Mexico U20
CONCACAF U-20 Championship: 2015

References

External links
 
 

1995 births
Living people
Mexican footballers
2015 CONCACAF U-20 Championship players
Mexico under-20 international footballers
Santos Laguna footballers
Tampico Madero F.C. footballers
La Equidad footballers
Liga MX players
Categoría Primera A players
Mexican expatriate footballers
Expatriate footballers in Colombia
Sportspeople from Ciudad Juárez
Footballers from Chihuahua
Association football defenders